Ouvrage Coume Annexe Nord is a lesser work (petit ouvrage) of the Maginot Line.  Located in the Fortified Sector of Boulay, the ouvrage consists of one infantry block, and is located between petits ouvrages Village Coume and Coume, facing Germany.

Design and construction
The site was surveyed by CORF (Commission d'Organisation des Régions Fortifiées), the Maginot Line's design and construction agency; Village Coume was approved for construction in July 1931. It was completed at a cost of 7 million francs by the contractor Duval-Weyrich of Nancy. The petit ouvrage was in effect designed and built as an isolated casemate, as opposed to an ouvrage with multiple combat blocks, deep underground support services and accommodations

Description
Coume Annex Nord comprises a single casemate. Armament includes two automatic rifle cloches (GFM), one retractable twin machine gun turret, one twin machine gun embrasure and one machine gun/anti-tank gun embrasure (JM/AC47).

Manning
The 1940 manning of the ouvrage under the command of Lieutenant Dillenschneider comprised 35 men and 1 officer of the 161st Fortress Infantry Regiment. The units were under the umbrella of the 3rd Army, Army Group 2. The Casernement de Ban Saint-Jean provided peacetime above-ground barracks and support services to Village Coume and other positions in the area.

History
See Fortified Sector of Boulay for a broader discussion of the Boulay sector of the Maginot Line.
Coume Annexe Nord played no significant role in either the Battle of France in 1940 or the Lorraine Campaign of 1944.

Current condition
Coume Annexe Nord remains in good condition, in private ownership.

See also
 List of all works on Maginot Line
 Siegfried Line
 Atlantic Wall
 Czechoslovak border fortifications

Notes

References

Bibliography
Allcorn, William. The Maginot Line 1928-45. Oxford: Osprey Publishing, 2003. 
Kaufmann, J.E. and Kaufmann, H.W. Fortress France: The Maginot Line and French Defenses in World War II, Stackpole Books, 2006. 
Kaufmann, J.E., Kaufmann, H.W., Jancovič-Potočnik, A. and Lang, P. The Maginot Line: History and Guide, Pen and Sword, 2011. 
Mary, Jean-Yves; Hohnadel, Alain; Sicard, Jacques. Hommes et Ouvrages de la Ligne Maginot, Tome 1. Paris, Histoire & Collections, 2001.  
Mary, Jean-Yves; Hohnadel, Alain; Sicard, Jacques. Hommes et Ouvrages de la Ligne Maginot, Tome 2. Paris, Histoire & Collections, 2003.  
Mary, Jean-Yves; Hohnadel, Alain; Sicard, Jacques. Hommes et Ouvrages de la Ligne Maginot, Tome 3. Paris, Histoire & Collections, 2003.  
Mary, Jean-Yves; Hohnadel, Alain; Sicard, Jacques. Hommes et Ouvrages de la Ligne Maginot, Tome 5. Paris, Histoire & Collections, 2009.

External links
 Annexe Nord de Coume at alsacemaginot.com 
 Coume (petit ouvrage A30 annexe nord de) at fortiff.be 
 Petit ouvrage de Coume Annexe Nord at lignemaginot.com 

Fortified sector of Boulay
Maginot Line